Nazarbaug Palace or Nazar Bāgh Palace was the Gaekwad's royal palace in the city of Vadodara, Gujarat state, western India. The Nazar Bāgh Palace' was built in 1721. It had three storeys and is the oldest palace in Baroda. It was constructed by Malhār Rāo Gaekwad in the late 19th century.  This palace was used on ceremonial occasions by the Gaekwads.  Till recently, it housed the royal family heirlooms.  It had solid gold and silver guns, each barrel weighing over 100 kg.  The grounds also contain the Shïsh Mahal, a Palace of Glass.

The Palace had a classic look, so in Gujarati it was told about its look as 'Nazar na laage' from which it was named Nazar. The Palace also had beautiful garden from which its name included baug. So it was named as Nazarbaug Palace.

The white-stucco palace was the depository of the jewels of the Gaekwad family, and in 1927 the collection was believed to be worth $10,000,000 at the time, including a diamond necklace which carried both the Star of the South diamond, weight around 125 carats, and the English Dresden; another important part of the collection was a cloth embroidered with precious stones and seed pearls, made to cover the tomb of Muḥammad.

The palace was in a state of ruin and did not reflect its former glory. The inside was ripped out after an alleged robbery. The grounds were used as a car park. Visitors were allowed to walk around but not allowed to take photos. Such is the state of this once beautiful palace the root of Gaekwad rule in Vadodara that was unrecognisable and possibly the land will be sold off for apartment constructions.

In October, 2014, the palace was completely razed with only rubble and some parts of the floor remaining.

References

External links
Official India Tours & Travels Information Portal

Tourist attractions in Vadodara
Palaces in Gujarat
History of Vadodara
Baroda State
Houses completed in 1721
1721 in India
1721 establishments in India